John Koech is a Kenyan politician. He  was cabinet minister for the East African Community in Kenya under President Mwai Kibaki and a member of parliament for the constituency of Chepalungu until December 2007 when he lost his parliamentary seat to Isaac Ruto, and dismissed from his cabinet post for supporting Raila Odinga against Kibaki.

References

Year of birth missing (living people)
Living people
Members of the National Assembly (Kenya)
Government ministers of Kenya